Furse may refer to:

Furse (surname), an English surname
Ulex (gorse), a genus of heathland plants
USS Furse (DD-882), a Gearing-class destroyer of the US Navy
 For the Ethiopian district in the Afar Region, see Fursi